Aaron Ridley (born July 31, 1962) is a British philosopher and Professor of Philosophy at the University of Southampton. He is known for his works on aesthetics, particularly the philosophy of music, and on Nietzsche.

Books
 The Deed is Everything: Nietzsche on Will and Action. Oxford University Press. 2018
(ed.) Arguing about art: contemporary philosophical debates. (Arguing About Philosophy). Routledge. 2007
 Routledge Philosophy Guidebook to Nietzsche on Art. (Routledge Philosophy Guidebooks). Routledge. 2007
The Philosophy of Music: Theme and Variations. Edinburgh University Press. 2004
Beginning Bioethics. Palgrave Macmillan. 1998
 Nietzsche's Conscience: Six Character Studies from the Genealogy. Cornell University Press. 1998
R.G. Collingwood: a Philosophy of Art. Orion Books. 1998
 Music, Value and the Passions. Cornell University Press. 1995
 (ed.) The philosophy of art: readings ancient and modern. McGraw-Hill. 1995

References

External links

Living people
1962 births
21st-century British philosophers
Academics of the University of Southampton
Nietzsche scholars
Philosophers of art
Philosophers of music
Alumni of the University of Cambridge
Academics of Bangor University
Ithaca College faculty